Carex burchelliana is a tussock-forming species of perennial sedge in the family Cyperaceae. It is native to parts of South Africa.

See also
List of Carex species

References

burchelliana
Taxa named by Johann Otto Boeckeler
Plants described in 1877
Flora of South Africa